The United States Department of the Army (DA) is one of the three military departments within the Department of Defense of the U.S. The Department of the Army is the federal government agency within which the United States Army (U.S.) is organized, and it is led by the secretary of the Army, who has statutory authority under 10 United States Code § 7013 to conduct its affairs and to prescribe regulations for its government, subject to the limits of the law, and the directions of the secretary of defense and the president.

The secretary of the army is a civilian official appointed by the president and confirmed by the Senate. The highest-ranking military officer in the department is the chief of staff of the Army, who is also a member of the Joint Chiefs of Staff. Other senior officials of the department are the under secretary of the Army (principal deputy to the secretary) and the vice chief of staff of the Army (principal deputy to the chief of staff.)

The Department of War was originally formed in 1789 as an Executive Department of the United States and was split by the National Security Act of 1947 into the Department of the Army and Department of the Air Force on September 18, 1947. By amendments to the National Security Act of 1947 in 1949, the department of the Army was transformed to its present-day status.

Organizational structure

The Department of the Army is a Military Department within the United States Department of Defense. The department is headed by the secretary of the army, who by statute must be a civilian, appointed by the president with the confirmation by the United States Senate. The secretary of the Army is responsible for and has the authority to conduct all the affairs of the Department of the Army, subject to the authority, direction and control of the secretary of defense. The Department of the Army is divided between its headquarters at the seat of government and the field organizations of the Army.

By direction of the secretary of defense, the secretary of the Army assigns Army forces, apart from those units performing duties enumerated in 10 United States Code § 7013 (i.e., organize, train & equip) or unless otherwise directed to the operational command of the commanders of the Combatant Commands. Only the secretary of defense (and the president) has the authority to approve transfer of forces to and from Combatant Commands by 10 United States Code § 162.

Headquarters, Department of the Army

Headquarters, Department of the Army is the corporate office of the department which exercises directive and supervisory functions and consists of two separate staffs: the Office of the Secretary of the Army (10 United States Code § 7014), the mainly civilian staff; and the Army Staff (10 United States Code § 7031, & 10 United States Code § 7032), the mainly military staff. The Office of the Secretary and the Army Staff are organized along similar lines, with civilians and military officers both overseeing similar program areas.

Office of the Secretary
The Office of the Secretary is led by the secretary of the Army, assisted by the under secretary of the Army and the administrative assistant to the secretary of the Army, who is the senior civilian career official of the department. The Office of the Secretary of the Army, also known as the Army Secretariat, is divided into multiple branches with functional responsibilities, the six most important of which are headed by one of the five assistant secretaries of the Army or the general counsel of the Army, each of whom are civilians appointed by the president and confirmed by the Senate.

The Army Staff

The Army Staff is led by the chief of staff of the Army, a four-star general who is the highest-ranking officer in the Army and the Army member of the Joint Chiefs of Staff. The chief of staff is assisted in managing the Army Staff by the vice chief of staff of the United States Army, a four-star general and second highest-ranking officer in the Army. The Army Staff is divided into several directorates, each headed by a three-star general; a deputy chief of staff (DCS G–1 (personnel), G–2 (intelligence), G–3 (operations), G–4 (logistics),  G-5 (planning), G-6 (network), G-7 (training), G-8 (finance), and G-9 (installations) respectively). the DCS G-3/5/7 is a single office for operations, plans, and training.

A key official within the Army Staff is the director of the Army Staff, who is a three-star general. The director is responsible for integrating and synchronizing the work of the Office of the Secretary and the Army Staff so that they meet the goals and priorities of the secretary of the Army. Other key figures within the Army Staff are the sergeant major of the Army, the United States Army judge advocate general, the chief of the Army Reserve, the United States Army provost marshal general, and the United States Army surgeon general. The chief of the National Guard Bureau was previously considered part of the Army Staff, but has been elevated to four-star rank and membership in the Joint Chiefs of Staff; the director of the Army National Guard and the director of the Air National Guard (both three-star positions) report to the chief, National Guard Bureau for strategy and policy, but receive funding and Service-specific guidance from their respective services, as they have different legal authorities.

Army commands and Army service component commands
 Headquarters, United States Department of the Army (§ HQDA):

Source: U.S. Army organization

See also
 Department of the Air Force
 Department of the Navy
 National Guard Bureau
 Office of the Secretary of Defense
 Office of the Chief Legislative Liaison (United States Army)
 Title 32 of the Code of Federal Regulations

Notes

References

Bibliography 
 Army General Order NO. 2020-01: ASSIGNMENT OF FUNCTIONS AND RESPONSIBILITIES WITHIN HEADQUARTERS, DEPARTMENT OF THE ARMY, Accessed on 2021-01-22.
 Army Regulation 10–87, Army Commands, Army Service Component Commands, and Direct Reporting Units, Accessed on 2021-01-22.

External links
Army.mil
Department of the Army in the Federal Register
Understanding the Army's Structure

1947 establishments in the United States
Army
Department
United States Department of Defense